Lucky to Me is a 1939 British musical comedy film directed by Thomas Bentley and starring Stanley Lupino, Phyllis Brooks and Barbara Blair. It was based on Lupino's own 1928 stage show So This is Love which he had co-written with actor Arthur Rigby. The film was made by ABPC at its Elstree Studios. It was the last film of Lupino who had made a string of successful musical comedies during the Thirties.

Cast
 Stanley Lupino as 'Potty' Potts
 Phyllis Brooks as Pamela Stuart
 Barbara Blair as Minnie 'Mousey' Jones
 Gene Sheldon as Hap Hazard
 Antoinette Cellier as Kay Summers
 David Hutcheson as Peter Malden
 Bruce Seton as Lord 'Tiny' Tyneside
 Geoffrey Sumner as Fanshaw
 Rosamund John as Girl
 Gordon McLeod as Doherty
 Julien Mitchell as Butterworth
 Edward Underdown as Malden's friend

References

Bibliography
 Low, Rachael. History of the British Film: Filmmaking in 1930s Britain. George Allen & Unwin, 1985 .

External links

1939 films
British musical comedy films
1939 musical comedy films
1930s English-language films
Films directed by Thomas Bentley
British films based on plays
Films set in England
Films set in London
British black-and-white films
Films shot at Associated British Studios
1930s British films